The Gothsicles is an American industrial and electronic body music (EBM) band formerly based out of Chicago, Illinois before moving to Boston, Massachusetts in 2018. The group was formed in Wisconsin in 2002 by Brian "darkNES" Graupner, who handles vocals and synthesizers, and is the sole consistent member. The band has a rotating lineup of live musicians, including Matt Fanale of Caustic, Matt Slegel of Angelspit, and David Dodson of Abstinence. The band released its first LP, NESferatu, in 2006. Following albums included Sega Lugosi's Dead (2009), Industrialites & Magic (2011), Squid Icarus (2014), and I Feel Sicle, which was released on November 4, 2016. According to COMA Music Magazine, "The Gothsicles are one of the forerunners in Industrial Music for the Nerdy Masses."

Known for "spastic" and energetic live performances, they have performed at major festivals such as Infest, Kinetik Festival, Resistanz, Game On Expo, Reverence Festival, Terminus Festival, Cold Waves Festival, and Mechanismus Festival. The band has had songs remixed by artists such as Leæther Strip, Project Pitchfork, Neuroticfish and Pankow. Side projects include The Causticles, a collaboration with Caustic, Hardcore Pong with Angelspit, and the weekly internet talk show, Space Couch.

History

2002-05: Founding

The Gothsicles was first formed around 2002 as an industrial and electronic body music (EBM) band in Madison, Wisconsin. Later based in Chicago, Illinois, members include Brian "darkNES" Graupner (vocals, synthesizers),  plus a rotating lineup of live musician that has included Matt "Sega Lugosi" Fanale (vocals), and Dan "Turbo Gothic 16" Clark (production, programming).

The Gothsicles officially started June 24, 2002 when The Gothsicles’ entry in a remix contest for the band Freezepop was selected as a winner Founding member Graupner, who writes the majority of their lyrics, had long been interested in diverse music genres. After being exposed to industrial and EBM in high school, he had become an avid fan of bands such as And One, who according to Graupner "sort of proved you could make goofy industrial music work." The band's name was chosen because Graupner found it "hilarious" in college. In 2003 The Gothsicles self-released the EP Etherblisster, and over the next several years performed the songs at festivals such as Reverence.

2006-09: NESferatu

Produced by Dan Clark of The Dark Clan, NESferatu is the first full-length album by The Gothsicles. Released in September 2006 on Sonic Mainline Records, the album's diverse themes include platform games, Konami, type fonts, and the importance of using turn signals. The end of the album includes remixes by artists such as Epsilon Minus, a Canadian techno duo that briefly reformed for the remix. According to Local Sounds Magazine, "this CD is one of the few examples of dark electronic comedy out there." Wrote critic Aaron Coats of Inside Pulse, "seventy percent sarcasm and thirty percent absurdity, this amusing album is both an ode to the goth cliche and a tribute to 8-bit gaming." Wrote Leslie Benson of NUVO in a positive review, "with video game clips and Pulp Fiction samples, some EBM beats and a Saved by the Bell’s Screech kind of lyrical comedy, the album even pokes fun at itself." The band toured in support of the album, and a free remix CD, NESferaTWO, was released on February 23, 2009.

The Chicago-based WTII Records signed the band in 2008, and their first album on WTII, Sega Lugosi's Dead, was released on March 31, 2009. Produced with help from Andrew Sega of Iris, it features artwork by Bogart Shwadchuck and Vlad McNeally.  Plastiksickness called the album "matured," praising the production and "serious EBM arrangements." In April 2011 they played music from the album at the first Resistanz Festival, held in Sheffield. Wrote Sound Sphere Magazine about the show, "the riotously funny Gothsicles... proudly displayed their geek chic and love of retro games consoles with hits like ‘Konami Code IV’ and ‘One Second Ghost’. This notoriously nerdy group really riled the crowd into a frenzy."

2011-14: Industrialites & Magic and Squid Icarus
Released on August 9, 2011 on WTII Records, their third album Industrialites & Magic was again written by Brian Graupner, with Dan Clark producing most tracks.  The album features guest vocals from Caustic, Xuberx and Critical System Error. Like their previous releases, the end of the album has remixes by groups such as Leather Strip, Caustic, and Yendri, Boole. Topics were again diverse, and their track "Save That Mermaid" is a reference to The Goonies II video game. The album peaked at No. 1 at Amazon.com in the "Goth and Industrial" category for most downloaded album. A music video for "Save That Mermaid" was released in August 2011, and was named Video of the Day by COMA Music Magazine.

As of early 2014, Graupner confirmed he'd completed an album that he called "the best thing I've ever done." The Gothsicles' 2014 album Squid Icarus came out on December 15, 2014 on Negative Gain Productions, after a Kickstarter campaign. The album has features by Angelspit and Cyferdyne, and the artwork was created with the help of Angelspit and fashion photographer Emily Gualdoni. Brutal Resonance called the album "brilliant," praising the production value by guest producers such as Assemblage 23, Faderhead, Rotersand, Christ Analogue, and Haujobb. Intravenous Magazine described the album as a "love letter to geek culture," and "their most club-friendly and well-rounded outing to date. The classic Gothsicle elements are all present such as Graupner's bat-shit crazy vocals, the 8-bit leads, and of course more nerdy nods than anyone would rightly admit to getting." According to IDie:YouDie, the album "definitely feels like the best transference of the band’s live energy over to record we’ve yet heard."

2015-16: I Feel Sicle
Two remix EPs followed the release of Squid Icarus. The Nyarlat Hot EP was released January 20, 2015 for WTII Records and featured remixes by God Module, Project F, as well as new original material. Squid Remixarus was released a year later on January 26 of 2016, featuring remix work from Beborn Beton, Kevin MacLeod, and Avarice in Audio. 
 
November 4, 2016, marked the release of The Gothsicles’ 5th full length album, “I Feel Sicle”. Of this album, Brutal Resonance said “Graupner and friends have cranked out another hilarious, 8-bit induced album with a couple of wonderful collaborations and dance floor hits.”

2017-18: SIC REMIXES, Konami Code 20th Anniversary EP, and Tigersquawk Records

A remix EP companion to I Feel Sicle, SIC REMIXES was released April 13, 2017, boasting remix work from several artists in including Neuroticfish, E-Craft, and Null Device. Said, IDie:YouDie, "Two unlikely great tastes that taste amazingly great together, did you ever think you would hear frigging Neuroticfish remix the ‘Sicles? We never did, but now that it’s arrived we are amped."

SIC REMIXES also initiated the founding of Graupner’s own record label, Tigersquawk Records.

2017 also saw the formation of the side-project, Gasoline Invertebrate, and its Freak Drive EP. A Kickstarter campaign was launched for this release and funded within three hours.

The coming of 2018 marked 20 years since the group’s single, Konami Code, was originally penned in 1998 for Graupner’s first solo electronic act, Sleeping Disorder. To commemorate this, the Konami Code 20 Year Anniversary EP was released on April 6, featuring remixes from acts such as Pankow and Studio-X, as well as a video for the new original track, IDDQD. The Gothsicles’ relocation from Chicago to Boston was also chronicled with the song, "The Gothsicles Are Moving to Boston in May of 2018".

Touring

Beyond regularly touring in Wisconsin and Illinois, since 2003 the band has performed at a number of major festivals. They were frequent performers at the Reverence Festival held in Madison, Wisconsin, appearing from 2004 to 2009. Other early notable shows include GenCon from 2004 to 2007, CONvergence from 2006 to 2007,  and MarsCon 2006 to 2008.  They were on stage with Caustic at the Indoctrination Festival in Chicago in 2006, and were the opening act at the British alternative event Infest 2007, where they were reviewed positively by the BBC. Also in 2007 they performed at Eccentrik Festival, a goth and industrial festival in Raleigh, North Carolina, and appeared at the final rendition of Blacksun Festival in New Haven, Connecticut.

In March 2009 the band embarked on the Vampirefreaks.com 'It Ain't Dead Yet Tour' with Caustic and Pr0metheus Burning. They toured 12 cities in a period of 2 weeks which spanned across the Midwest and East Coast. They performed at the Kinetik Festival in 2010 in Montreal, also writing the song "Holy Shit We're Playing Kinetik!" for the occasion. The band also wrote a song dedicated to their first performance at Resistanz Festival, to be included on the festival's compilation CD. Explained Graupner, "When festivals of that caliber want me on their bill, I get amazingly effin’ pumped and those songs are the result. It would be dishonest of me to write any other kind of track for those comps." They have performed three times at the Montreal industrial music festival C.O.M.A., appearing in 2010, 2012, and 2013. In late 2012 The Gothsicles undertook a tour of the United States with bands such as Deviant UK, for all the emptiness, Die Sektor. In June 2013 they performed at Terminus Festival, and in the summer of 2014 toured Canada as part of the Minitour with for all the emptiness and Hätz.

2015 saw a nationwide, coast to coast U.S. tour in support of Squid Icarus with Angelspit.

In 2016, The Gothsicles headlined the last night of Sheffield, England’s final Resistanz Festival and commemorated the event with the release of the song “One of the Last Bands Ever To Play Resistanz Festival”, a complete to their initial song for the event, “The First Band Ever to Play Resistanz Festival”, released in 2011.

The Gothsicles were also the featured band on the annual Gothic Cruise, bound in 2016 for Alaska. For this event, The band released “The Gothic Cruise to Alaska 2016 Juneau Reactor EP” (a play on electronic band, Juno Reactor).

2017 marked a banner year for live performance with slots on Milwaukee's Sanctuary Festival, a return to the Terminus Festival, Chicago's Cold Waves Festival, and MAGFest presents: Game Over Richmond. The Gothsicles also completed their first European tour with gigs in Helsinki, Reykjavik and a headlining slot at London's Beat:Cancer Festival. The band returned to the Sanctuary Festival in 2018 and appeared at Seattle's Mechanismus Festival.

Side projects, vlog
The Gothsicles frequently collaborate with other musicians and have formed various side projects, including
 Space Couch, a weekly talk show simulcast live over the internet
 Space Couch Podcast, audio from the live show repackaged in podcast form
 Tigersquawk Records, a record label headed by Graupner
 The Causticles, a collaboration with Caustic
 The Nightsicles, a collaboration with Finnish synthwave band, NightStop
 Crudmouth, 90s-style grunge band with Cory Gorski of Canadian electronic band, Volt 9000
 Gasoline Invertebrate, a dark industrial project that has spawned two EPs
 Hardcore Pong, a video-game themed collaboration with Australian group, Angelspit
 Dinosaur Tank, a chip-tune project
 Khionik, a collaboration with Roanoke, VA-based artist, Syrinx
 DJ Fishdick, Graupner's Creature From The Black Lagoon-based DJ persona
 False Edge, a collaboration with Chicago artist, Death 0f Self
 Gothsticulate, which involves Caustic and Geoff Lee's EDM project Modulate
 Noiseferatu, 2015 touring project with Angelspit and The Dead Room, offering a live scoring of the silent film classic, Nosferatu

Style and equipment
Style and influences
The Gothsicles are known for blending various electronic genres, particularly industrial music, electronic body music, and industrial offshoots such as dark electro. COMA Music Magazine wrote that the band creates "oddball EBM" that's "fun, loud and entertaining." Graupner has cited artists such as Atom and his Package, Weird Al, and Neotek as influences. Though the band's songs address diverse and often random topics, lyrics regularly reference the classic NES console and games such as Contra, River City Ransom, and Goonies II.

Live shows and equipment
Their "spastic" live shows are energetic and often include visual elements such as video. The live band consists of Brian Graupner and a rotating lineup of musicians such as Matt Fanale, with occasional guest production from artists such as Dan Clark.

Members

Studio and live
Brian "darkNES" Graupner (2002–present) - vocals, synthesizers, songwriting

Live members
Current as of 2022

Discography

Albums

Extended plays

Singles

Compilations

Remixes by The Gothsicles

Remixes of The Gothsicles

Further reading
Interviews

Discographies
The Gothsicles at Allmusic
The Gothsicles at Discogs

See also
Industrial music

References

External links

The Gothsicles on Facebook
The Gothsicles on Twitter

Audio and video
The Gothsicles on Bandcamp
The Gothsicles on YouTube
The Gothsicles on Kickstarter

American electro-industrial music groups
American electronic music groups
Musical groups established in 2004
Musical groups from Wisconsin
Electronic music groups from Wisconsin